Bronisław (feminine: Bronisława) is a Polish name of Slavic origin meaning broni (to protect, to defend) and sława (glory,  fame). The name may refer to:

People
 Bronislava of Poland, a 13th-century nun who was beatified in 1839
 Bronisław Czech, a Polish sportsman and artist
 Bronisław Dankowski, a Polish politician
 Bronisław Geremek, a Polish social historian and politician
 Bronisław Huberman, a Jewish Polish violinist
 Bronislav Kaminski, was the commander of the S.S. Sturmbrigade R.O.N.A
 Bronisław Kaper, a Polish film composer who scored films and musical theater in Germany, France, and the USA
 Bronisław Knaster, a Polish mathematician; from 1939 university professor in Lwów, from 1945 in Wrocław
 Bronisław Komorowski, President of Poland
 Bronisław Malinowski (athlete)
 Bronisław Malinowski, a Polish anthropologist, widely considered one of the most important 20th-century anthropologists
 Bronislava Nijinska, a Russian dancer, choreographer, and teacher of Polish descent

Places
Bronisław, Greater Poland Voivodeship (west-central Poland)
Bronisław, Radziejów County in Kuyavian-Pomeranian Voivodeship (north-central Poland)
Bronisław, Mogilno County in Kuyavian-Pomeranian Voivodeship (north-central Poland)

See also
 
 Branislav, a given name